Gurbangeldi Muhammedowiç Batyrow (born 28 July 1988) is a Turkmen footballer currently playing for FC Altyn Asyr. He has also been capped by the national team in which he has appeared twice and scored one goal.

Club career 
Since 2017 plays for FC Altyn Asyr.

International career

Batyrow has played for Turkmenistan twice playing in the two 2014 AFC Challenge Cup qualification against the Philippines and Cambodia.

Honors
AFC President's Cup:
Winner: 2014

References

1988 births
Living people
Turkmenistan footballers
Turkmenistan international footballers
Association football midfielders
FC Altyn Asyr players
2019 AFC Asian Cup players